Darkfall is a 2009 MMORPG video game.

Darkfall may also refer to:

Darkfall (Koontz novel), a 1984 novel by Dean Koontz
Darkfall (Carmody novel), a 1997 novel by Isobelle Carmody
Dark Fall, a 2002 horror video game
"Darkfall", a song by God Is an Astronaut on the 2007 album Far from Refuge